was one of Japan's first modern warships, a frigate powered by both sails and steam. She was built in the Netherlands, and served in the Boshin War as part of the navy of the Tokugawa shogunate, and later as part of the navy of the Republic of Ezo. She was wrecked on 15 November 1868, off Esashi, Hokkaido, Japan.

Construction and design

Kaiyō Maru was ordered in 1863, and built by Cornelis Gips and Sons, at Dordrecht, Netherlands, for a sum of 831,200 guilders. Her construction was overseen by a Japanese military mission under Uchida Masao and Akamatsu Noriyoshi. She was launched in October 1866, and anchored before Vlissingen on 23 October. Kaiyō Maru arrived in Japan in November of the same year. She was the largest wooden warship ever built by a Dutch shipyard at the time.

Career

In January 1868 Kaiyō Maru was engaged in the naval battle of Awa off Awaji Island, where she, Banryū Maru and Hazuru Maru battled against the Satsuma Navy's Kasuga Maru, Hōō Maru, and Heiun Maru. During the battle, Hōō Maru was sunk off the coast of Awa.

In late January 1868, Kaiyō Maru, Kanrin Maru, Hōō Maru,  and five other modern ships fled to Hokkaido, under Admiral Enomoto Takeaki. They carried a handful of French military advisors, and their leader Jules Brunet. While in Hokkaido, they became a part of the navy of the short-lived Ezo Republic, founded by Enomoto Takeaki. Kaiyō Maru became the flagship of the navy of the Ezo Republic, but she soon was wrecked off Esashi, Hokkaido, Japan, during a storm on 15 November 1868. The steamship Shinsoku made a rescue attempt, but it too sank.

Salvage
The guns and ship chandlery of Kaiyō Maru were discovered on the seafloor on 14 August 1968 by the submarine Yomiuri-Gō (読売号). Further remains were discovered but project financing prevented the salvage at that time however several items were recovered in 1969. Dives were conducted in August 1974 that confirmed a need for excavation of the extensive remains. Full scale excavation of the wreck from a depth of  began in June 1975. The salvage of portions of the wreck located in the open sea were completed in seven years. The inland portions of the wreck were slowed by poor visibility. Costs for the salvage totaled over 3 million yen by 1985. Desalinization of the recovered artifacts began upon recovery. A replica of  Kaiyō Maru was constructed in 1990. She is now on display at the docks in Esashi and has become a tourist attraction showing the salvaged remains of the original ship.

References

Citations

Books

Journals

External links
A replica of the Kaiyō Maru in Esashi 

Museum ships in Japan
Shipwrecks in the Sea of Japan
Shipwrecks of Japan
Three-masted ships
1865 ships
Japan–Netherlands relations
Rangaku
Ships of the Tokugawa Navy
Ships of the Republic of Ezo Navy
Maritime incidents in November 1868
Ships built in the Netherlands
Auxiliary steamers
Steamships of Japan